Church of the Holy Spirit or Holy Spirit Church may refer to:

Estonia 
 Church of the Holy Spirit, Tallinn
 Holy Spirit Church, Valga

France 
 Church of the Holy Spirit, Paris

India 
 Holy Spirit Church Nandakhal

Germany 
 Church of the Holy Spirit, Heidelberg
 Church of the Holy Spirit, Wolfsburg, Germany
 Heilig-Geist-Kirche, Munich
 St. Matthew, Leipzig, formerly Heiliggeistkirche (Church of the Holy Spirit)
 Holy Spirit (Pfaffenhofen an der Ilm)

Italy 
 
 Church of the Holy Spirit (Alcamo), Trapani, Sicily
 Church of the Holy Spirit, Palermo, Sicily

Slovakia 
 Church of the Holy Spirit, Bratislava
 Holy Spirit Church (Košice)

Ukraine 
 Church of the Holy Spirit, Chernihiv

United Kingdom 
 Church of the Holy Spirit, Burpham, Surrey
 Holy Spirit Church, Newtown, Isle of Wight

United States 
 Holy Spirit Church (Stamford, Connecticut)
 Church of the Holy Spirit (Lake Wales, Florida)

Other places 
 Holy Spirit Church, Bale, Croatia
 Church of the Holy Spirit, Prague, Czech Republic
 Church of the Holy Ghost, Copenhagen, Denmark
 Church of the Holy Spirit (Batumi), Georgia's autonomous republic of Adjara
 Holy Spirit Church (Sajópálfala), Hungary
 Holy Spirit Church Nandakhal, India
 Orthodox Church of the Holy Spirit, Vilnius, Lithuania
 Church of the Holy Spirit, Żejtun, Malta
 Church of the Holy Spirit in Warsaw, Poland
 Church of the Holy Spirit, Lund, Sweden
 Church of the Real Colegio del Espíritu Santo (La Clerecía) in Salamanca; Spain

See also 
 Church of the Holy Ghost (disambiguation)
 Holy Spirit Cathedral (disambiguation)
 Church of the Holy Spirit, Vilnius (disambiguation)